Ewell is a ghost town in Sumner County, Kansas, United States.  It is located about 3.5 miles southwest of Conway Springs at 0.25 mile southeast of the intersection of N Bluff Rd and W 60th Ave N, next to an abandoned railroad.

History
Ewell was located next to a former railroad between Conway Springs and Argonia.

Ewell had a post office between 1885 and 1906.

This community no longer exists, though a modern home and its buildings exist on the site.

Education
The rural area around the former community is currently served by Conway Springs USD 356 public school district.

References

Further reading

External links
 Sumner County map, KDOT

Unincorporated communities in Sumner County, Kansas
Unincorporated communities in Kansas